Al Bairre was an Indie pop-rock band from Cape Town that existed between 2012 and 2017.

Over the years the five-person band (three men, Kyle Davis, Tom Kotze and Nicolas Preen and two women, Tessa Johnson and Julia Johnson) played in London, UK, Berlin, Germany, Rorschach, Switzerland and various cities in South Africa.

Publicity
During their five years in action, they were featured in various publications including: YES Lifestyle Magazine, THE BIG ISSUE and Your LMG.

Awards
In 2014, Al Bairre won two MK awards (for Best Newcomer and Best Music Video).

Break up
In 2017, the band announced they would be splitting up saying "Having achieved all the goals we set for ourselves over the last 5 years - we all feel like it’s the right time to try something new,"

References

South African rock music groups
Musical groups from Cape Town